In computer science,  sorting is the problem of sorting pairs of numbers by their sums. Applications of the problem include transit fare minimisation, VLSI design, and sparse polynomial multiplication. As with comparison sorting and integer sorting more generally, algorithms for this problem can be based only on comparisons of these sums, or on other operations that work only when the inputs are small integers.

It is unknown whether this problem has a comparison-based solution whose running time is asymptotically faster than sorting an unstructured list of equally many items. Therefore, research on the problem has focused on two approaches to settle the question of whether such an improvement is possible: the development of algorithms that improve on unstructured sorting in their number of comparisons rather than in their total running time, and lower bounds for the number of comparisons based on counting cells in subdivisions of high-dimensional spaces. Both approaches are historically tied together, in that the first algorithms that used few comparisons were based on the weakness of the cell-counting lower bounds.

Problem statement and history
In terms of its big O notation, this method is the fastest known algorithm for  sorting. Whether a faster algorithm exists is an open problem, posed by Elwyn Berlekamp prior to 1975.

A variant of the problem sorts the sumset, the set of sums of pairs, with duplicate sums condensed to a single value.

Applications
Steven Skiena recounts a practical application in transit fare minimisation, an instance of the shortest path problem: find the cheapest two-hop airplane ticket between two given cities, from an input that describes both the cost of each hop and which pairs of hops may be combined into a single ticket. Skiena's solution consists of sorting pairs of hops by their total cost as an instance of the  sorting problem, and then testing the resulting pairs in this sorted order until finding one that is allowed. To generate the sorted pairs in this order, Skiena uses a priority queue of pairs, initially containing only a single pair, the one consisting of the two cheapest hops. Then, when a pair  is removed from the queue and found to be disallowed, two more pairs are added, with one of these two pairs combining  with the next hop after  in a sorted list of the hops to the destination, and the other pair combining  with the next hop after  in a sorted list of hops from the start. In this way, each successive pair can be found in logarithmic time, and only the pairs up to the first allowable one need to be sorted.

 sorting is the most expensive subroutine in an algorithm for a problem in VLSI design, in which one must place two subunits of a VLSI circuit side-by-side along a communications channel in order to minimize the width of the channel needed to route pairs of wires from one subunit to the other. As one subunit is continuously shifted relative to the other, the channel width only changes at discrete positions where the ends of two wires line up with each other, and finding the sorted ordering of these positions in order to compute the sequence of changes to the width can be performed by  sorting. If this sorting problem could be sped up, it would also speed up this VLSI design task.

Another application involves polynomial multiplication for polynomials of a single variable that may have many fewer terms than their degrees. The product of two polynomials can be expressed as a sum of products of pairs of terms, one from each polynomial, and placing these term-by-term products into degree order amounts to sorting them by the sum of degrees. For example, the instance of  sorting with  given as an example above corresponds to the  multiplication of two three-term polynomials to produce a nine-term polynomial:

The degrees are always integers, so integer-based algorithms for  sorting may be applied. However, for polynomials whose number of terms is comparable to their degree, FFT-based polynomial multiplication algorithms may be significantly more efficient than term-by-term multiplication.

Number of orderings
A well-known lower bound for unstructured sorting, in the decision tree model, is based on the factorial number of sorted orders that an unstructured list may have. Early work on  sorting followed a similar approach by asking how many different sorted orderings are possible for this problem, and proving that this number is at most . However, because its binary logarithm is at most , much smaller than the known time bounds for  sorting, this method can only lead to weak lower bounds on the number of comparisons.

The proof of this bound relates  sorting to the complexity of an arrangement of hyperplanes in high-dimensional geometry. The two input collections for the  sorting problem comprise  numbers, which can alternatively be interpreted as the Cartesian coordinates of a point in the -dimensional space . This space can be subdivided into cells, so that within a single cell all points correspond to inputs that produce the same sorted order.

The number of cells that this number of hyperplanes can divide a space of dimension  into is
 Therefore, the set  has  different possible sorted orderings.

A similar style of analysis has been more successful in ruling out fast solutions to certain generalizations of  sorting, by showing that they have too many orderings to sort quickly. This idea of using a row-sorted and column-sorted matrix forms the basis for the method used by Skiena in the transportation application, and it can reduce the number of comparisons by a constant factor relative to naive comparison sorting. Therefore, if the  sorting problem is to be solved quickly, the solution must use
additional information about the set  beyond this matrix ordering.

Number of comparisons
For the classical comparison sorting problem, the time to sort and the number of comparisons needed to sort are within constant factors of each other.
But for  sorting, the number of comparisons is smaller than the best time bound known: Michael Fredman showed in 1976 that  sorting can be done using only  comparisons. More generally, he showed that any set of  elements, whose sorted ordering has already been restricted to a family  of orderings, can be sorted using  comparisons, by a form of binary insertion sort. However, in Fredman's method, the time needed to decide which comparisons to perform may be significantly higher than the bound on the number of comparisons.

The algorithm performs the following steps:
Merge the two sets  and  into a single sorted order, using a number of comparisons linear in their total size.
Use the merged order and the equivalence  to infer the sorted order of  without additional comparisons.
The part of the algorithm that recursively sorts  (or equivalently ) does so by the following steps:
Recursively sort  and 
Infer the ordering on  using only the comparisons from a single merge step as above.
The number of comparisons  needed to perform this recursive algorithm on an input of  items can be analyzed using the recurrence relation

The master theorem for recurrence relations of this form shows that  The total time complexity is slower, because of the steps of the algorithm that use already-made comparisons to infer orderings of other sets. These steps can be performed in time  by using a standard comparison-sorting algorithm with its comparison steps replaced by the stated inferences.

Non-comparison-based algorithms
Just as integer sorting can be faster than comparison sorting for small-enough integers, the same is true for  sorting. In particular,

Related problems
Several other problems in computational geometry have equivalent or harder complexity to  sorting, including constructing Minkowski sums of staircase polygons, finding the crossing points of an arrangement of lines in sorted order by their -coordinates, listing pairs of points in sorted order by their distances, and testing whether one rectilinear polygon can be translated to fit within another.

The problem of testing whether two of the pairs in the  sorting problem have equal sums can be solved by sorting the pairs and then testing consecutive pairs for equality. In turn, it could be used to solve the 3SUM problem, implying that it is unlikely to have a strongly subquadratic algorithm.

References

Sorting algorithms
Unsolved problems in computer science